Pterocalla striata is a species of ulidiid or picture-winged fly in the genus Pterocalla of the family Ulidiidae.

References

striata
Insects described in 1909